Bayswater is a community in the Canadian province of Nova Scotia, located in the Chester Municipal District on the Aspotogan Peninsula in Lunenburg County on the Lighthouse Route (Nova Scotia Route 329). The community is home to Bayswater Beach Provincial park, Swissair 111 memorial, and All Saints Anglican Church

History 
German settlers who first settled were Richard and Knickle who came from Lunenburg. Settled prior to 1767.

An early immigrant to Bayswater was James Boutilier from Montbéliard, eastern France.  He had nine children; the first was born in Bayswater in 1862.

The village is probably named after Bayswater in England, an area of west London in the City of Westminster. It is a residential district located three miles (4.8 km) west-northwest of Charing Cross and borders the north side of Hyde Park and Kensington Gardens.

Bayswater was initially named Sandy Beaches.

Swissair 111 
A Swissair Flight 111 memorial site is located in Bayswater. Bayswater is the site of the recovery operation for Swissair Flight 111. There is another memorial near the community of Peggy's Cove. The bodies of the unidentified passengers and crew are interred at this site.

Parks
Bayswater Beach Provincial Park
Swissair 111 Memorial

Nearby Islands
 Saddle island
 Gravel Island
 Big Tancook Island
 Little Tancook Island

Nearby communities

 Blandford
 Chester
 Aspotogan
 Fox Point
 Deep Cove

References 

Bayswater on Destination Nova Scotia

Communities in Lunenburg County, Nova Scotia
General Service Areas in Nova Scotia